Sertan Yiğenoğlu (born 4 January 1995) is a German-Turkish footballer who plays as a centre back for Turkish TFF Third League club Turgutluspor.

Club career 
Yiğenoğlu is a youth exponent from 1. FC Köln. He first played professional football for FC Hennef 05 in the Regionalliga West during the 2014–15 season. Since the 2015–16 season he plays for the second team of 1860 Munich in the Regionalliga Bayern. He gave his debut for the first team in a 0–1 home defeat against Karlsruher SC on 19 October 2015.

At the beginning of the 2016–17 season Yiğenoğlu transferred to SV Wehen Wiesbaden.

International career 
Yegenoglu was born in Germany to parents of Turkish descent. He is eligible for both the Turkish and Germany national teams - he accepted a callup to the Turkish U19s, but has yet to make an appearance for either side.

Club statistics

References 

1995 births
German people of Turkish descent
People from Siegburg
Sportspeople from Cologne (region)
Footballers from North Rhine-Westphalia
Living people
German footballers
Turkish footballers
Association football defenders
1. FC Köln players
FC Hennef 05 players
TSV 1860 Munich II players
TSV 1860 Munich players
SV Wehen Wiesbaden players
Konyaspor footballers
1922 Konyaspor footballers
Tuzlaspor players
Sportfreunde Lotte players
Utaş Uşakspor footballers
Turgutluspor footballers
Regionalliga players
2. Bundesliga players
3. Liga players
TFF Second League players
TFF Third League players